Gerson Torres Barrantes (born 28 August 1997) is a Costa Rican professional footballer who plays as a midfielder for Liga FPD club Herediano and the Costa Rica national team.

Career

Club career

Youth career
Torres joined Belen's youth academy in 2012. He continued through Belén Youth Academy successfully going through U-17. Until finally reaching the first team, Gerardo Ureña being the coach promoting torres to first team when he was just 17 years of age.

Club America
Torres had slowly worked his way up from the U-20 team up to the first team where he made appearances in the Copa MX. Torres was set to make his Liga MX debut on 19 March 2017 against UNAM however due to league regulation America was notified that Torres was ineligible to play for the first team due to being registered as a foreigner on the U-20 team.

Necaxa
Following his year at America, Torres signed a 5-year extension with Herediano. Torres is set to be on loan for the 2018 year at Necaxa.

International career
He made his international debut on 15 January 2017, in a 3–0 friendly win over Belize. His first goal came as a stoppage-time header to defeat Honduras on 16 November 2021, as part of CONCACAF's third round of qualification for the 2022 FIFA World Cup. Such a goal was highly crucial for Costa Rica, as it represented a watershed moment between a very difficult first half of the Octagonal for Costa Rica and a near-perfect second half that saw the team reaching the intercontinental play-off.

International goals
Scores and results list Costa Rica' goal tally first.

Honours

Herediano
 Liga FPD: Apertura 2018, Apertura 2019

Necaxa
 Copa MX: Clausura 2018

References

External links

Nacion Gerson Torres Sub-20 America (Spanish)
Medio Tiempo debut

1997 births
Living people
Costa Rican footballers
Costa Rican expatriate footballers
Costa Rica international footballers
Costa Rica under-20 international footballers
C.S. Herediano footballers
Club América footballers
Club Necaxa footballers
Liga FPD players
Liga MX players
Association football midfielders
Costa Rican expatriate sportspeople in Mexico
Expatriate footballers in Mexico
2017 Copa Centroamericana players
People from Heredia Province
2022 FIFA World Cup players